Gregory Haughton (born 10 November 1973) is a Jamaican 400 metres runner.  He won three Olympic medals, one at the 1996 Summer Olympics and two at the 2000 Summer Olympics. His personal best for the 400 m was 44.56 seconds.

He was coached by Clyde Hart, an individual who also trained world record-holder Michael Johnson. Individually, Haughton was the bronze medallist at the 2000 Sydney Olympics and won bronze medals over 400 m at the World Championships in Athletics in 1995 and 2001. He won gold medals at the 2001 Goodwill Games, 1999 Pan American Games, 1993 Central American and Caribbean Championships in Athletics. He was twice NJCAA Champion and a three-time NCAA 400 metres champion.  He won five Jamaican national titles in his career.

As a long-standing member of Jamaica's 4×400 metres relay team, Haughton was crowned 2004 World Indoor Champion, 1998 Commonwealth Champion, 1999 Pan American Games champion. He won Olympic bronze medals in the relay in 2000 and 1996, as well as four silver medals at the World Championships.

Haughton was inducted into the Virginia Sports Hall of Fame (1997), George Mason University Hall of Fame (2001), and the Carreras Sports Foundation Male Athlete of the Year (1999–2000).  In April 2011 Greg Haughton received the award from the Inter-Secondary Schools Sports Association for Outstanding Contribution to Track and Field in Jamaica.

Personal bests

Achievements

References

 

1973 births
Living people
Sportspeople from Kingston, Jamaica
Jamaican male sprinters
Athletes (track and field) at the 1998 Commonwealth Games
Athletes (track and field) at the 1999 Pan American Games
Athletes (track and field) at the 1996 Summer Olympics
Athletes (track and field) at the 2000 Summer Olympics
Olympic athletes of Jamaica
Olympic bronze medalists for Jamaica
Commonwealth Games medallists in athletics
World Athletics Championships medalists
Medalists at the 2000 Summer Olympics
Medalists at the 1996 Summer Olympics
Pan American Games gold medalists for Jamaica
Olympic silver medalists for Jamaica
Olympic silver medalists in athletics (track and field)
Olympic bronze medalists in athletics (track and field)
Commonwealth Games gold medallists for Jamaica
Pan American Games medalists in athletics (track and field)
Goodwill Games medalists in athletics
World Athletics Indoor Championships winners
World Athletics Indoor Championships medalists
Competitors at the 2001 Goodwill Games
Medalists at the 1999 Pan American Games
Central American and Caribbean Games medalists in athletics
Central American and Caribbean Games silver medalists for Jamaica
Competitors at the 1998 Central American and Caribbean Games
20th-century Jamaican people
21st-century Jamaican people
Medallists at the 1998 Commonwealth Games